The Italian general election of 2001 took place on 13 May 2001.

The election was won in Sardinia by the centre-right House of Freedoms coalition, which won also nationally. Forza Italia was the most voted party with 30.2%.

Results

Chamber of Deputies

|- bgcolor="#E9E9E9"
!style="background-color:#E9E9E9" align=left rowspan=2 valign=bottom|Coalitions
!colspan="3" align="center" valign=top|Single-seat constituencies
!colspan="5" align="center" valign=top|Proportional system
!colspan="1" align="center" valign=top|Total
|-
|- bgcolor="#E9E9E9"
|align="center" valign=top|votes
|align="center" valign=top|votes (%)
|align="center" valign=top|seats
|align="center" valign=top|Parties
|align="center" valign=top|votes
|align="center" valign=top|votes (%)
|align="center" valign=top|seats
|align="center" valign=top|tot.
|align="center" valign=top|seats
|-

|-
|rowspan="4" align="left" valign=top|House of Freedoms
|rowspan="4" align="right" valign=top|449,633
|rowspan="4" align="right" valign=top|45.2
|rowspan="4" align="right" valign=top|9

|rowspan="1" align="left"|Forza Italia
|align="right"|304,989
|align="right"|30.2
|align="right"|2

|rowspan="4" align="right" valign=top|2
|rowspan="4" align="right" valign=top|11

|-

|rowspan="1" align="left"|National Alliance
|align="right"|137,054
|align="right"|13.6
|align="right"|-

|-

|rowspan="1" align="left"|CCD-CDU
|align="right"|46,295
|align="right"|4.6
|align="right"|-

|-

|rowspan="1" align="left"|New Italian Socialist Party
|align="right"|10,590
|align="right"|1.1
|align="right"|-

|-
|rowspan="4" align="left" valign=top|The Olive Tree
|rowspan="4" align="right" valign=top|431,798
|rowspan="4" align="right" valign=top|43.4
|rowspan="4" align="right" valign=top|5

|rowspan="1" align="left"|Democrats of the Left
|align="right"|162,723
|align="right"|16.1
|align="right"|1

|rowspan="4" align="right" valign=top|2
|rowspan="4" align="right" valign=top|7

|-

|rowspan="1" align="left"|Democracy is Freedom – The Daisy
|align="right"|135,985
|align="right"|13.5
|align="right"|1

|-

|rowspan="1" align="left"|Party of Italian Communists
|align="right"|28,088
|align="right"|2.8
|align="right"|-

|-

|rowspan="1" align="left"|Greens–Socialists
|align="right"|17,255
|align="right"|1.7
|align="right"|-

|-
|rowspan="1" align="left"|Communist Refoundation Party
|rowspan="1" align="right"|-
|rowspan="1" align="right"|-
|rowspan="1" align="right"|-

|rowspan="1" align="left"|Communist Refoundation Party
|align="right"|47,699
|align="right"|4.7
|align="right"|-

|rowspan="1" align="right"|-
|rowspan="1" align="right"|-

|-
|rowspan="1" align="left"|Sardinian Action Party–Sardinia Nation
|rowspan="1" align="right"|40,692
|rowspan="1" align="right"|4.1
|rowspan="1" align="right"|-

|rowspan="1" align="left"|Sardinian Action Party–Sardinia Nation
|align="right"|34,412
|align="right"|3.4
|align="right"|-

|rowspan="1" align="right"|-
|rowspan="1" align="right"|-

|-
|rowspan="1" align="left"|Italy of Values
|rowspan="1" align="right"|33,971
|rowspan="1" align="right"|3.4
|rowspan="1" align="right"|-

|rowspan="1" align="left"|Italy of Values
|align="right"|33,375
|align="right"|3.3
|align="right"|-

|rowspan="1" align="right"|-
|rowspan="1" align="right"|-

|-
|rowspan="1" align="left"|European Democracy
|rowspan="1" align="right"|14,776
|rowspan="1" align="right"|1.5
|rowspan="1" align="right"|-

|rowspan="1" align="left"|European Democracy
|align="right"|19,335
|align="right"|1.9
|align="right"|-

|rowspan="1" align="right"|-
|rowspan="1" align="right"|-

|-
|rowspan="1" align="left"|Bonino List
|rowspan="1" align="right"|12,213
|rowspan="1" align="right"|1.2
|rowspan="1" align="right"|-

|rowspan="1" align="left"|Bonino List
|align="right"|17,930
|align="right"|1.8
|align="right"|-

|rowspan="1" align="right"|-
|rowspan="1" align="right"|-

|-
|rowspan="1" align="left"|Others
|rowspan="1" align="right"|12,233
|rowspan="1" align="right"|1.2
|rowspan="1" align="right"|-

|rowspan="1" align="left"|others
|align="right"|13,568
|align="right"|1.3
|align="right"|-

|rowspan="1" align="right"|-
|rowspan="1" align="right"|-

|-
|- bgcolor="#E9E9E9"
!rowspan="1" align="left" valign="top"|Total coalitions
!rowspan="1" align="right" valign="top"|995,316
!rowspan="1" align="right" valign="top"|100.0
!rowspan="1" align="right" valign="top"|14
!rowspan="1" align="left" valign="top"|Total parties
!rowspan="1" align="right" valign="top"|1,009,298
!rowspan="1" align="right" valign="top"|100.0
!rowspan="1" align="right" valign="top"|4
!rowspan="1" align="right" valign="top"|4
!rowspan="1" align="right" valign="top"|18
|}
Source: Ministry of the Interior

Senate

|- bgcolor="#E9E9E9"
!style="background-color:#E9E9E9" align=left rowspan=2 valign=bottom|Coalitions
!colspan="3" align="center" valign=top|Single-seat constituencies
!colspan="1" align="center" valign=top|Prop.
!colspan="1" align="center" valign=top|Total
|-
|- bgcolor="#E9E9E9"
|align="center" valign=top|votes
|align="center" valign=top|votes (%)
|align="center" valign=top|seats
|align="center" valign=top|seats
|align="center" valign=top|seats
|-
|rowspan="1" align="left" valign=top|House of Freedoms
|rowspan="1" align="right" valign=top|413,098
|rowspan="1" align="right" valign=top|45.1
|rowspan="1" align="right" valign=top|4
|rowspan="1" align="right" valign=top|1
|rowspan="1" align="right" valign=top|5
|-
|rowspan="1" align="left"|The Olive Tree
|rowspan="1" align="right" valign=top|369,025
|rowspan="1" align="right" valign=top|40.3
|rowspan="1" align="right" valign=top|2
|rowspan="1" align="right" valign=top|2
|rowspan="1" align="right" valign=top|4
|-
|rowspan="1" align="left"|Communist Refoundation Party
|rowspan="1" align="right" valign=top|36,830
|rowspan="1" align="right" valign=top|4.0
|rowspan="1" align="right" valign=top|-
|rowspan="1" align="right" valign=top|-
|rowspan="1" align="right" valign=top|-
|-
|rowspan="1" align="left"|Sardinian Action Party–Sardinia Nation
|rowspan="1" align="right" valign=top|32,822
|rowspan="1" align="right" valign=top|3.6
|rowspan="1" align="right" valign=top|-
|rowspan="1" align="right" valign=top|-
|rowspan="1" align="right" valign=top|-
|-
|rowspan="1" align="left"|Italy of Values
|rowspan="1" align="right" valign=top|27,971
|rowspan="1" align="right" valign=top|3.1
|rowspan="1" align="right" valign=top|-
|rowspan="1" align="right" valign=top|-
|rowspan="1" align="right" valign=top|-
|-
|rowspan="1" align="left"|European Democracy
|rowspan="1" align="right" valign=top|13,601
|rowspan="1" align="right" valign=top|1.5
|rowspan="1" align="right" valign=top|-
|rowspan="1" align="right" valign=top|-
|rowspan="1" align="right" valign=top|-
|-
|rowspan="1" align="left"|Bonino List
|rowspan="1" align="right" valign=top|13,376
|rowspan="1" align="right" valign=top|1.5
|rowspan="1" align="right" valign=top|-
|rowspan="1" align="right" valign=top|-
|rowspan="1" align="right" valign=top|-
|-
|rowspan="1" align="left"|Others
|rowspan="1" align="right" valign=top|9,203
|rowspan="1" align="right" valign=top|1.0
|rowspan="1" align="right" valign=top|-
|rowspan="1" align="right" valign=top|-
|rowspan="1" align="right" valign=top|-
|-
|- bgcolor="#E9E9E9"
!rowspan="1" align="left" valign="top"|Total coalitions
!rowspan="1" align="right" valign="top"|915,926
!rowspan="1" align="right" valign="top"|100.0
!rowspan="1" align="right" valign="top"|6
!rowspan="1" align="right" valign="top"|3
!rowspan="1" align="right" valign="top"|9
|}
 Source: Ministry of the Interior

Elections in Sardinia
2001 elections in Italy
May 2001 events in Europe